Droxypropine is a cough suppressant of the phenylpiperidine class.

References

Antitussives
4-Phenylpiperidines
Ketones
Ethers